Lawson Henry Bennett (28 August 1938 – January 2011) was an English professional footballer who played as a right winger in the Football League for Accrington Stanley.

References

1938 births
2011 deaths
Footballers from Blackburn
English footballers
Darwen F.C. players
Accrington Stanley F.C. (1891) players
Nelson F.C. players
English Football League players
Association football wingers